Waste characterisation (waste characterization US) is the process by which the composition of different waste streams is analysed. Waste characterisation plays an important part in any treatment of waste which may occur. Developers of new waste technologies must take into account what exactly waste streams consist of in order to fully treat the waste. The biodegradable element of the waste stream is vitally important in the use of systems such as composting or anaerobic digestion.

Waste characterization is a manual process carried beside waste management plants in a process that consists of taking 1 tone from a garbage truck, dividing the sample into 4 parts, mixing them, dividing again into 4 parts and take one of them (250kg) to analyze them manually. This is a process that takes around 3-4 hours to complete the characterization and generally involves 2-4 people.

Even if this process is carried out very frequently (usually every 2 or 3 days), it is only a sample of the composition of the waste. Solid material waste is classified in material recovery facilities with mechanical tools (magnetic for metal, air pumps for plastic films, ramps for rolling objects, etc.) but, in fact, nobody knows exactly what each garbage truck contributes to the waste management plant.

Municipal waste streams are commonly broken down into the following constituents:

Film plastic-LDPE
Dense plastic-HDPE, PET
Ferrous metal
Non-ferrous metals
Glass
Textiles
"Other" any remaining items which do not fit

Biodegradable fraction
Glass
Paper & cardboard
Garden waste or green waste
Fines (items below a certain screen size)

The European Waste Catalogue
Overview

The European Waste Catalogue (acronym EWC) refers to a set (although non-exhaustive) list of wastes that are derived from both households and businesses inside the European Union. The EWC is used to derive a code (six numbers in 3 sets of 2) that adequately describes the waste being transported, handled or treated.  The EWC is used where Duty of Care Notices or Waste Transfer Notes are passed between waste management companies, waste carriers and to report volumes received or treated back to the governing agency (such as the Environment Agency in England and Wales, Scottish Environmental Protection Agency (SEPA) in Scotland, Northern Ireland (NI) Environment Agency, etc.).

Typical Waste Characterisation & reporting

The first step in characterising waste is to decide on the appropriate EWC code. These codes carry three categories - absolute non-hazardous, mirror entries and absolute hazardous.  Initial assessment for the majority of wastes follows a simple derivation of industry (some 20 main categories) from which they were originally obtained (Agricultural, wood working (furniture), Electronics, etc. ).  Each Derived section (denoted by the first 2 sets of 2 numbers refers to a particular industry or sector).  The final set of 2 numbers relates directly to the waste. Where a waste is hazardous by its very composition, the EWC is followed by an asterisk).

Each member states Environment Agency throughout the European Union is obligated to adopt the EWC in its reporting methods and to enforce its use by the respective waste management sector.   The lists are available through the European Commission's website.  Submissions by Waste Management Companies  to their respective Member states Environmental Agency are collated, in many instances by conversion to EWC STAT (European Waste Catalogue for Statistics)  for submission to the EU, who oversees all member states and ensures compliance with unilaterally agreed standards and recycling rates.

Absolute Hazardous Wastes

Waste entries are hazardous, not due to the composition of the waste but by virtue of the process that produced it, the same is true for non-hazardous absolute entries. Mirror entries can either be hazardous or non-hazardous depending on the composition of the waste.

Deciding whether a mirror entry is hazardous or non-hazardous by composition involves reference to the Approved Supply List (ASL) initially. If a substance is not listed in the ASL then the regulations permit the use of other sources such as Manufacturer's Safety Data Sheets (MSDS) to classify the waste. These documents contain Risk Phrases, which describe the hazards that the substance or substances present. Risk phrases have threshold values attached to them that indicate what concentration of a substance must be present in order for the waste to be classified as hazardous by the Hazard Code attached to the Risk Phrase.

Examples of Waste Characterizations

- How is a waste characterization study? 

- What is a Waste Characterization Study? 

- Webinar: Best Practices for Waste Characterization

See also
List of waste treatment technologies

Landfill
Waste legislation in the European Union
Waste management